Ralph Earhart (March 29, 1923 – May 1, 1997) was a halfback in the National Football League.

Biography
Earhart was born on March 29, 1923 in Milburn, Oklahoma.

Career
Earhart was drafted by the Green Bay Packers in the thirty-second round of the 1948 NFL Draft and played two seasons with the team. He played at the collegiate level at Texas Tech University.

See also
List of Green Bay Packers players

References

1923 births
1997 deaths
People from Johnston County, Oklahoma
Players of American football from Oklahoma
American football halfbacks
Pittsburg State Gorillas football players
Texas Tech Red Raiders football players
Green Bay Packers players